The 2000 German Athletics Championships were held at the Eintracht-Stadion in Braunschweig on 29–30 July 2000.

Results

Men

Women

References 
 Results source: 

2000
German Athletics Championships
German Athletics Championships
German Athletics Championships
20th century in Braunschweig